The Waikato and King Country regions of New Zealand are built upon a basement of greywacke rocks, which form many of the hills.  Much of the land to the west of the Waikato River and in the King Country to the south has been covered by limestone and sandstone, forming bluffs and a karst landscape. The volcanic cones of Karioi and Pirongia dominate the landscape near Raglan and Kawhia Harbours.  To the east, the land has been covered with ignimbrite deposits from the Taupo Volcanic Zone.  Large amounts of pumice from the Taupo Volcanic Zone have been deposited in the Waikato Basin and Hauraki Plains.

Basement rocks
As with most of New Zealand, the basement rocks of the Waikato Region and King Country are composed of greywacke (indurated sandstone, siltstone and mudstone).

The Waipa Fault passes north–south through the Waikato-King Country region, from Taupiri, along the Waipā River, and south to near Ohura.  It represents a major dividing line between different terranes.

Murihiku Terrane greywacke lies beneath the Waikato-King Country region on the western side, and outcrops to the west of the Waipa Fault, from south of Waikato Heads to Awakino.  The Murihiku Terrane is considered to be an accretionary wedge of mainly volcanogenic forearc sediments.  It was formed in Late Triassic to Late Jurassic times (220-145 Ma).

A line of Dun Mountain-Maitai Terrane rocks are assumed to pass north–south along the Waipa Fault, through the centre of the Waikato-King Country region, separating the Murihiku Terrane and Waipapa Composite Terrane, and produce a detectable Junction Magnetic Anomaly, but only outcrops at one place, at Wairere.  Some Murihiku rocks occur to the east of the Junction Magnetic Anomaly, forming the Taupiri and Hakarimata Ranges, but it is assumed that these rocks have been shifted to their present position.

The Waipapa Morrinsville Terrane greywacke lies beneath the Waikato-King Country region on the eastern side, south of the Hunua Ranges, and east of the Waipa Fault. It was formed in Late Jurassic to Early Cretaceous times (160-120 Ma).

Te Kuiti Group coal and limestone
The Te Kuiti Group rocks overlie the basement rocks, and are present in Northland, Auckland, the Waikato, and King Country, although they have often been eroded or covered.  Rocks containing coal were formed from swampland in Late Eocene times (37-34 Ma).  The land sunk and the sea transgressed, and calcareous sandstone, mudstone, and limestone were deposited in Oligocene times (34-24 Ma).

The coal deposits outcrop near Huntly and Maramarua, where they are mined.

Limestone exists in the area south and west of the Waikato River, down to Piopio and Te Kuiti, producing impressive bluffs around Port Waikato, Raglan Harbour, Kawhia Harbour, Otorohanga, Waitomo, Te Kuiti, etc.  The Karst landscape around Waitomo contains many cave systems, including the Waitomo Glowworm Cave.

Miocene sediment
In early Miocene times (24 Ma), plate convergence caused regional compression.  The land eroded, and was deposited throughout the Miocene (24-5 Ma) in rapidly subsiding basins.  These soft sandstones and mudstones remain to the southwest of Te Kuiti.

Mohakatino Volcanic Arc
The volcanic arc that developed to the west of Northland and Auckland extended further south towards Taranaki.  These andesitic and basaltic volcanoes were mostly active in middle Miocene times (14-11 Ma), and contributed to the sandstone and mudstone deposits that formed around that time.

Recent volcanic activity
Mount Karioi and Mount Pirongia, near Raglan and Kawhia Harbours, are large stratovolcanoes composed of andesite and basalt, that erupted about 2.5 Ma ago.  Other volcanoes in this group include Kakepuku, Te Kawa, and Tokanui.

Maungatautari, west of Te Awamutu, is a volcano, composed of andesite and dacite, that erupted about 1.8 Ma.

Ignimbrite and pumice deposits
Over the last 2 million years, pyroclastic flows from the Taupo Volcanic Zone have deposited ignimbrites over the area East of Te Kuiti.  Some of the largest deposits are from the Whakamaru eruption, north of Taupo, around 330,000 years ago.  The ignimbrite deposits from the Oruanui eruption 26,500 years ago, and the Taupo eruption, 1800 years ago are also major deposits.  They form impressive cliffs in many areas.

The Hauraki Plains and Hauraki Gulf are believed to represent a rift valley.  The rift valley is assumed to have developed about 2 Ma ago, due to the clockwise rotation of the Eastern North Island, that stretched the land between Auckland and East Cape.  The Waikato River used to flow from Lake Karapiro, through the Hinuera Gap, and Hauraki Plains, to come out on the east coast in the Hauraki Gulf.  The sediment from the 26.5 ka Oruanui eruption of Lake Taupo caused the river to change direction, and come out to the west.  In fact, the Waikato River changes its route quite regularly, as eruptions occur in the Taupo Volcanic Zone, and the river channel becomes blocked.  Many lakes and swamps in the Waikato Basin represent old routes.

Pumice from the Taupo Volcanic Zone has been deposited throughout the Waipa and Waikato Basins, and the Hauraki Plains, forming excellent soils and swampland.

Tauranga Group 
Tauranga Group describes sediments of the last 5 million years, mainly of volcanic pumice, initially Pliocene deposits (Walton Subgroup) from Coromandel and latterly Holocene from Taupo (Piako Subgroup). They underlie the Hamilton lowlands and extend into the Waipa basin, but elsewhere are mainly alluvial deposits in valleys. As well as pumice gravels and sands, they include silts, muds and peat.

Coastal dunes
Substantial sand dunes with high iron content have formed around the Kawhia and Aotea Harbours.

David Kear's 'Geology of Ironsand Resources of New Zealand' (NZ Dept of Scientific & Industrial Research 1979) says, "The ironsand deposits extend from south Kaipara and Muriwai, north of Auckland, for over 300 miles southwards to the Whangaehu River, south of Wanganui". Soluble iron in concentrates exceeds 50% in most locations. It is currently mined at Taharoa and Waikato North Head.

Geological sites worth visiting
Hinuera Gap, State Highway 29, between Lake Karapiro and Matamata is the course of the Waikato River, before it changed to go through Hamilton.  The cliffs on either side show how big the river was.
Much of the Western hill country from Waikato Heads down to Te Kuiti contains interesting limestone countryside, with impressive bluffs.  However, you need to take the small, unsealed roads to see much. The Lake Disappear polje is on one of these roads.
The Waitomo Area contains excellent examples of a Karst landscape, and several tourist caves, including the most famous Waitomo Glowworm Cave.
The Raglan, Aotea, and Kawhia Harbours are worth a visit, especially the dissected hill country around Raglan formed on greywacke basement rocks, the limestone countryside, the sand dunes and beach near Kawhia, and Albatross Point west of Kawhia Harbour.
Karioi and Pirongia volcanoes are well worth climbing, for those with sufficient fitness.  A drive around Karioi has impressive scenery, especially the Te Toto Gorge.
Wairere has the one outcrop of serpentine in the North Island.
Mangpehi Mine, near Benneydale is an abandoned coal mine.
The coastal highway down to Taranaki has rugged sandstone cliffs, and black sand beaches.
The road from Te Kuiti through to Atiamuri has impressive Whakamaru Group welded ignimbrite cliffs.

Maps
Geological maps of New Zealand can be obtained from the New Zealand Institute of Geological and Nuclear Science (GNS Science), a New Zealand Government Research Institute.

GNS provides a free Map of New Zealand's Geological Foundations.

The main maps are the 1 : 250 000 QMap series, which will be completed as a series of 21 maps and booklets in 2010.  Low resolution versions of these maps (without the associated booklet) can be downloaded from the GNS site for free.  The map for the Waikato Area was published in 2005.

See also
Geology of New Zealand
 a list of the most significant Waikato geological features

References

Further reading
Graham, Ian J. et al.; A continent on the move : New Zealand geoscience into the 21st century -  The Geological Society of New Zealand in association with GNS Science, 2008. 

Waikato
Geography of Waikato
Geography of Manawatū-Whanganui